Stan Joplin (born June 17, 1957) is a former head men's basketball coach at the University of Toledo from 1996 to 2008.

Playing career
Joplin played guard at the University of Toledo from 1975–79.  He was named to the second-team All-MAC for the 1977–78 and 1978–79 seasons.  Joplin made a buzzer-beating shot in a 74–72 victory over Iowa in the first round of the 1979 NCAA Men's Division I Basketball Tournament.  During his career, Joplin had an 82–27 record.  Joplin was also a member of the 1979 MAC Championship team.

Coaching career
Joplin served as the head men's basketball coach for the University of Toledo for 12 seasons. He was named MAC Coach of the Year after the 2006-2007 season in which Toledo won the Regular Season MAC Championship. He is the second winningest coach in school history.  Prior to his time at the University of Toledo Joplin was also the coach for Toledo Start High School.  His first team was 0-21 in the 1981/82 school year. He coached the Cougars of Southview to a record of 21-2 in 2017-18.

Career record

Personal life
Stan's son Shaun Joplin, was a Wide Receiver for the Bowling Green State University football team and is now a special teams coordinator for the Cougars.

References

1957 births
Living people
American men's basketball coaches
American men's basketball players
Basketball coaches from Michigan
Basketball players from Michigan
College men's basketball head coaches in the United States
High school basketball coaches in the United States
Kent State Golden Flashes men's basketball coaches
Michigan State Spartans men's basketball coaches
People from Milan, Michigan
Toledo Rockets men's basketball coaches
Toledo Rockets men's basketball players